William Westerhold (January 21, 1836 – May 12, 1910) was a sergeant in the United States Army during the American Civil War. He received a Medal of Honor, the highest military decoration awarded by the United States government, for his actions at the Battle of Spotsylvania Court House on May 12, 1864.

Military service
After emigrating from Prussia, Westerhold joined the Army from New York City in October 1861, and was assigned to the 52nd New York Infantry. He was commissioned as an officer a few days after his MOH action, and mustered out with his regiment in July 1865.

He was awarded the Medal of Honor for action on May 12, 1864, at Spotsylvania, Virginia. He is credited with risking his life to capture the flag of a Confederate Army regiment, the 23rd Virginia Infantry.

Medal of Honor citation
The President of the United States of America, in the name of Congress, takes pleasure in presenting the Medal of Honor to First Lieutenant William Westerhold, United States Army, for, Capture of flag of 23d Virginia Infantry (C.S.A.) and its bearer.

See also

List of Medal of Honor recipients
List of American Civil War Medal of Honor recipients: T–Z

References

1836 births
1910 deaths
Prussian emigrants to the United States
Union Army officers
Foreign-born Medal of Honor recipients
United States Army Medal of Honor recipients
People of New York (state) in the American Civil War
American Civil War recipients of the Medal of Honor